Elisabeth "Liesel" Jakobi, married surname Luxenburger (née Jakobi; born 28 February 1939) is a German former track and field athlete who competed in the long jump for West Germany.

Born in Saarbrücken, she took up athletics and began training with the local club, ATSV Saarbrücken. She reached the peak of continental competition at the age of nineteen by winning the gold medal in the long jump at the 1958 European Athletics Championships in Stockholm.

At national level that year she only placed third in the long jump at the West German Athletics Championships. Over her career she was a national runner-up once (1959) and twice more a third-place finisher (1960 and 1963), but she never won the West German title. She was, however, twice a national sprint champion indoors over 60 metres, winning that title first in 1960 and again in 1963. She stopped competing at a high level shortly after getting married.

See also
List of European Athletics Championships medalists (women)

References

Living people
1939 births
Sportspeople from Saarbrücken
German female long jumpers
German female sprinters
West German female long jumpers
West German female sprinters
European Athletics Championships medalists
20th-century German women